Steff Cras (born 13 February 1996) is a Belgian cyclist, who currently rides for UCI ProTeam .

Career
In August 2019 he rode the 2019 Vuelta a España. In October 2019 Cras had been announced to join  on an initial two-year deal following the demise of his current team . In August 2020, he was named in the startlist for the 2020 Tour de France. This was his first ever Tour, his job was to ride in support of Caleb Ewan who was aiming for the Green Points Jersey. The 2021 Volta a Catalunya was a race where COVID-19 was rampant, Cras unfortunately caught COVID and had to abandon the race before the last stage. After two years at  Cras announced a one-year contract extension to remain with the team till the end of 2022. On 17 August 2022 it was announced that Cras would join  for two seasons from 2023. Cras started in the 2022 Vuelta a España but crashed heavily in Stage 2 so did not finish the stage and pulled out of the race.

Major results

2014
 2nd Overall Tour du Valromey
1st Stage 1
2015
 10th Overall Ronde de l'Isard
2016
 8th Overall Ronde de l'Isard
 8th Overall Course de la Paix U23
 8th Overall Tour de Savoie Mont-Blanc
2017
 3rd Time trial, National Under-23 Road Championships
 3rd Overall Ronde de l'Isard
 4th Overall Tour Alsace
 5th Overall Tour de l'Avenir
 5th Overall Grand Prix Priessnitz spa
 5th Gran Premio Palio del Recioto
2018
 7th Overall Arctic Race of Norway
 7th Overall Okolo Slovenska
2019
 9th Tokyo 2020 Test Event
2022
 4th Classic Grand Besançon Doubs
 5th Mercan'Tour Classic
 8th Clásica Jaén Paraíso Interior

Grand Tour general classification results timeline

References

External links

1996 births
Living people
Belgian male cyclists
People from Geel
Cyclists from Antwerp Province
21st-century Belgian people